Nazar Hussain (born 24 August 1988) is a Pakistani cricketer who plays for Balochistan cricket team. He was the leading wicket-taker for Rawalpindi in the 2017–18 Quaid-e-Azam Trophy, with 35 dismissals in seven matches.

In January 2021, he was named in Balochistan's squad for the 2020–21 Pakistan Cup.

References

External links
 

1988 births
Living people
Pakistani cricketers
Balochistan cricketers
Quetta cricketers
Rawalpindi cricketers
People from Pishin District